Bjørnafjorden is a municipality in Vestland county, Norway. It is located in the Midhordland region of the county. The administrative centre of Bjørnafjorden is the village of Osøyro. Other villages in the municipality include Eikelandsosen, Fusa, Holdhus, Holmefjord, Vinnes, Strandvik, Sundvord, Hagavik, Halhjem, Søfteland, Søre Øyane, and Søvik.

The  municipality is the 205th largest by area out of the 356 municipalities in Norway. Bjørnafjorden is the 47th most populous municipality in Norway with a population of 25,213.

General information
The municipality was established on 1 January 2020 when the municipalities of Os and Fusa were merged.

Name
The municipality is named after the local fjord: Bjørnafjorden.

Coat of arms
The coat of arms for Bjørnafjorden was adopted in 2019. The blue arms show a gold boat with two curved gold waves beneath it. The waves symbolize the water, but the curved design alludes to rosemaling designs and the local Giant's kettles in Koldal in the municipality.

Churches
The Church of Norway has two parishes  within the municipality of Bjørnafjorden. It is part of the Fana prosti (deanery) in the Diocese of Bjørgvin.

Government
All municipalities in Norway, including Bjørnafjorden, are responsible for primary education (through 10th grade), outpatient health services, senior citizen services, unemployment and other social services, zoning, economic development, and municipal roads. The municipality is governed by a municipal council of elected representatives, which in turn elects a mayor.  The municipality falls under the Hordaland District Court and the Gulating Court of Appeal.

Municipal council
The municipal council  of Bjørnafjorden is made up of 35 representatives that are elected to four year terms. The party breakdown of the council is as follows:

Notable people

 Haldor Johan Hanson (1856 in Fusa – 1929), an American hymn writer, publisher and author
 Nils Tveit (1876 in Os – 1949), a Norwegian politician, Mayor of Os 1916 to 1940
 Ragnvald Indrebø (1891 in Os – 1984), a Norwegian Lutheran Bishop 
 of Bjørgvin
 Mons Haukeland (1892 in Os – 1983), a Norwegian gymnastics teacher and military officer
 Harald Slåttelid (1895 in Os – executed 1943), a trade unionist, newspaper editor and communist resistance member
 Pål Sundvor (1920 in Fusa – 1992), journalist, novelist, children's writer, poet and playwright.
 Trine Linborg (born 1965 in Os), a politician, mayor of Os
Terje Søviknes (born 1969), a politician, former mayor of Os & former Minister of Petroleum and Energy
 Olve Eikemo (born 1973), stage name Abbath a black metal musician, grew up in Lysefjorden
 Maya Vik (born 1980), singer, songwriter and bass player, brought up in Os
 Marius Neset (born 1985 in Os), a Norwegian jazz saxophonist
 Ingrid Søfteland Neset (born 1992 in Os), an award-winning Norwegian classical flautist
 Boy Pablo (born 1998), musician, grew up in Bergen and later in Os; real name Nicolas Muñoz.

Sport 
 Kjersti Plätzer (born 1972 in Os), a race walker, twice silver medallist at the 2000 & 2008 Summer Olympics
 Egil Gjelland (born 1973), a former biathlete, team gold medallist at the 2002 Winter Olympics lives in Skjelbreid in Fusa
 Liv Grete Skjelbreid (born 1974 in Fusa), a biathlete, silver medallist at the 2002 Winter Olympics 
 Bjørn Dahl (born 1978 in Os), a retired footballer with almost 300 club caps
 Bjarte Haugsdal (born 1990 in Os), a football player with over 250 club caps
Sverre Lunde Pedersen (born 1992 in Os), a speed skater, son of Jarle Pedersen and two-time World Junior Champion

References

 
Municipalities of Vestland
2020 establishments in Norway
Populated places established in 2020